Tobsha Learner is a British/Australian novelist, playwright and screenwriter. Her first collection of short stories, Quiver, sold 150,000 copies worldwide. She has sold over 790 thousand books and is in translation in a number of countries. Her publishers have included Tor US, LittleBrown UK and HarperCollins AU. She is married with three stepsons, and while currently residing in New York has until recently divided her time between London and California.

Early life

Learner was born in Cambridge, England and raised in London. She is the daughter of Anglo-Australian parents: Arnold Learner, an English-born mathematician, who was killed in a motorcycle accident in London at forty and his first wife Eva Learner née Rechts, social worker, feminist and humanist who was born in Palestine then migrated to Australia aged four. Learner's parents moved to England in the late 1950s. She has two siblings Adam and Ruth Learner.

Learner went to Paddington Comprehensive then onto Hornsey College of Art for a Foundation year. During that year she also trained as a marble carver in Carrara, Italy, apprenticed to the Australian sculptor Joel Ellenberg. After which she migrated at eighteen to Melbourne, Australia. She then went to the Victorian College of the Arts to complete a BA in sculpture. But in her second year, began to return to her first love of theatre. Firstly through performance art then playwriting after becoming one of the founders of avant-garde theatre company 'Straight-face Productions.'

In 1989 Learner was one of the founding sponsors of the National Foundation for Australian Women. Her "Literary papers, 1983-1992", are held by the Mitchell Library at the State Library of New South Wales.

After completing her degree she moved to Sydney, where she did a playwright's course at the National Institute of Dramatic Art then on to AFTRS, the Australian Film, Television and Radio School for a screenwriting course. Her mentors included writer/teacher Paul Thompson and director Jimmy Sherman.

Plays

Plays 

 Is It Buckskin That Holds the Card?, 1984
 Angels, 1988
 The Waters of Pham Thi Lan, 1994
 Wolf : A Dedication to Priapus, Currency Press, 1992, 
The Glass Mermaid, Currency Press, 1994, 
Les Enfants du Paradis, adaptor of the work by Jacques Prevert, 1988
Miracles, Currency Press, 1998, 
Seven Acts of Love (as witnessed by a cat), Hilary Linstead & Associates, 1995
Fidelity, 2004
Black Wedding, 2009

Short plays 

 Feast, 1993
 The Gun in History, 1994
 Cage, 2017

One person plays 

 Witchplay, Currency Press, 1995, 
Mistress, 1990
S.N.A.G., 1992
Homage, 2004

Radio plays 

 Volkov, 1987
 Lionheart, 1992
 Queen Song, Australian Broadcast Corporation, 1996

Short films 

 Feast, 1990, directed by Jill Moonie
 Antonio's Angel (original story by Rosalba Clemente)
 Succubus, directed by Harry Weinmann

Books

Historical fiction (as Tobsha Learner) 

The Witch of Cologne, Forge, 2005, 
Soul, HarperCollins, 2006, 
The Magick of Master Lilly, Little, Brown Book Group, 2018,

Thrillers (as T.S.Learner) 

Sphinx: A Secret for a Thousand Years, HarperCollins, 2009, Sphere, Little Brown UK
The Map: Decipher the Clues, Discover the Truth, HarperCollins, 2012, 
The Stolen, Sphere, 2014,

Thrillers (as Tobsha Learner) 

 Madonna Mars : An Erotic Thriller, Viking, 1998, 
 Picture This, Unbound, 2016,

Erotic fiction (short story collection) 

 Quiver: A Book of Erotic Tales, Viking, 1996, 
 Tremble: Sensual Fables of the Mystical and Sinister, HarperCollins, 2004, 
 Yearn: Tales of Lust and Longing, HarperCollins, 2011,

References

External links
 Tobsha Learner's Website
 Tobsha Learner's Erotic Fiction Website
 T.S. Learner's Website
Australian Script Centre Website

1959 births
Living people
20th-century English women writers
20th-century English writers
21st-century English women writers
People from Cambridge
English women non-fiction writers
English feminist writers
Women historical novelists